Thomas Leopold (born 1693 near Kristianstad, Scania, died 1771 in Kungälv) was one of the prophets and martyrs of the Swedish Pietist movement during the 18th century.

Leopold's father Sigfrid had immigrated from Germany, and his mother was the daughter of an immigrant Scotsman.

At 35 years of age, during studies in Lund, Sweden, Leopold was imprisoned for his radical profession of faith and remained a prisoner for 42 years, 32 years of which was in Bohus Fortress, where he died, aged 77.

Sometimes he was visited at the castle by Lutheran priests, who told him he could be freed immediately, if only he denounced his Radical-Pietistic beliefs. He always answered calmly that he had promised Jesus to be faithful until the end.

Leopold's prison cell is still preserved and can be visited at the fortress during summer.

See also
 Pietism
 Radical Pietism
 Johann Konrad Dippel
 Lars Ulstadius
 Bohus Fortress

1693 births
1771 deaths
Radical Pietism
18th-century Protestant martyrs
18th-century Swedish people
Swedish people who died in prison custody
Prisoners who died in Swedish detention
Age of Liberty people